Chryseobacterium solani  is a Gram-negative, aerobic and rod-shaped bacteria from the genus of Chryseobacterium which has been isolated from rhizosphere soil from the plant Solanum melongena in Pyeongtaek in Korea.

References

Further reading 
 

solani
Bacteria described in 2015